Snead's Green, sometimes written Sneads Green, is an area of Droitwich Spa, Worcestershire, England.

Francis Moule, of Snead's Green House, sold the manorial rights in 1809. The house had been owned by the Moule (or Moyle) family since 1621.

References 

Villages in Worcestershire
Droitwich Spa